Chełm is a Polish parliamentary constituency in the Lublin Voivodeship.  It elects twelve members of the Sejm.

The district has the number '7' and is named after the city of Chełm.  It includes the counties of Biała Podlaska, Biłgoraj, Chełm, Hrubieszów, Krasnystaw, Parczew, Radzyń Podlaski, Tomaszów Lubelski, Włodawa, and Zamość, and the city counties of Biała Podlaska, Chełm, and Zamość.

List of members

2019-2023

Footnotes

Electoral districts of Poland
Lublin Voivodeship
Chełm